Karlsruhe-Hagsfeld station is a railway station in the Hagsfeld district in the municipality of Karlsruhe, located in Baden-Württemberg, Germany.

References

Hagsfeld
Buildings and structures in Karlsruhe